Decentralized finance (often stylized as DeFi) offers financial instruments without relying on intermediaries such as brokerages, exchanges, or banks by using smart contracts on a blockchain. DeFi platforms allow people to lend or borrow funds from others, speculate on price movements on assets using derivatives, trade cryptocurrencies, insure against risks, and earn interest in savings-like accounts. DeFi uses a layered architecture and highly composable building blocks. Some applications promote high interest rates but are subject to high risk. Coding errors and hacks have been common in DeFi.

History

Decentralized exchanges (abbreviated DEXs) are alternative payment ecosystems with new protocols for financial transactions that emerged within the framework of decentralized finance, which is part of blockchain technology and FinTech.
 
CEXs, DEXs and DEX aggregators are all built on the multi-layered DeFi architecture or components, where each layer serves a well-defined purpose. (See Figure: Multi-layered Architecture of the DeFi Stack). 

While they share common components of the first four layers, such as Settlement layer, Asset layer, Protocol layer and Application layer, DEX aggregators have an additional component or Aggregator layer, which allows them to connect and interact with other DEXs via smart contracts.

The Ethereum blockchain popularized smart contracts, which are the basis of DeFi, in 2017. Other blockchains have since implemented smart contracts.

MakerDAO is a prominent lending DeFi platform based on a stablecoin that was established in 2017. It allows users to borrow DAI, a token pegged to the US dollar. Through a set of smart contracts that govern the loan, repayment, and liquidation processes, MakerDAO aims to maintain the stable value of DAI in a decentralized and autonomous manner.

In June 2020, Compound Finance started rewarding lenders and borrowers with cryptocurrencies, in addition to typical interest payments to lenders, units of a cryptocurrency called COMP. This token, which is used for running Compound, can also be traded on cryptocurrency exchanges. Other platforms followed suit, leading to stacked investment opportunities known as "yield farming" or "liquidity mining," where speculators shift cryptocurrency assets between pools in a platform and between platforms to maximize their total yield, which includes not only interest and fees but also the value of additional tokens received as rewards. 

In July 2020, The Washington Post described decentralized finance techniques and the risks involved. In September 2020, Bloomberg said that DeFi made up two-thirds of the cryptocurrency market in terms of price changes and that DeFi collateral levels had reached $9 billion. Ethereum saw a rise in developers during 2020 due to the increased interest in DeFi. 

DeFi has attracted venture capitalists such as Andreessen Horowitz and Michael Novogratz.

The Economist regarded the future of digital finance in 2022 as a "three-way fight" between: Big Tech, such as Facebook with its digital wallet; "big rich countries" that have been testing their own digital currencies; and software developers "building all sorts of applications" to decentralize finance. Handling the risks presented by crypto-assets already valued at $2.5 trillion was a particular challenge for US regulators.

Key characteristics

DeFi revolves around decentralized applications, also known as DApps, that perform financial functions on distributed ledgers called blockchains, a technology that was made popular by Bitcoin and has since been adapted more broadly.  Rather than transactions being made through a centralized intermediary such as a cryptocurrency exchange or a traditional securities exchange, transactions are directly made between participants, mediated by smart contract programs. These smart contracts, or DeFi protocols, typically run using open-source software that is built and maintained by a community of developers.

DApps are typically accessed through a browser extension or application. For example, MetaMask allows users to directly interact with Ethereum through a digital wallet. Many of these DApps can be linked to create complex financial services. For example, stablecoin holders can lend assets like USD Coin or DAI to a liquidity pool in a borrow/lending protocol like Aave, and allow others to borrow those digital assets by depositing their own collateral. The protocol automatically adjusts interest rates based on the demand for the asset. Some DApps source external (off-chain) data, such as the price of an asset, through blockchain oracles.

Additionally, Aave introduced "flash loans", which are uncollateralized loans of an arbitrary amount that are taken out and paid back within a single blockchain transaction. Many exploits of DeFi platforms have used flash loans to manipulate cryptocurrency spot prices. 

Another DeFi protocol is Uniswap, which is a decentralized exchange (DEX) set up to trade tokens issued on Ethereum. Rather than using a centralized exchange to fill orders, Uniswap pays users to form liquidity pools in exchange for a percentage of the fees collected from traders swapping tokens in and out of the liquidity pools. Because no centralized party runs Uniswap (the platform is governed by its users), and any development team can use the open-source software, there is no entity to check the identities of the people using the platform and meet KYC/AML regulations. It is not clear what position regulators will take on the legality of such platforms.

Decentralized exchanges 

Decentralized exchanges (DEX) are a type of cryptocurrency exchange which allows for direct peer-to-peer cryptocurrency transactions to take place without the need for an intermediary.

In transactions made through decentralized exchanges, the typical third party entities which would normally oversee the security and transfer of assets (e.g. banks, stockbrokers, online payment gateways, government institutions, etc.) are substituted by a blockchain or distributed ledger. Some common methods of operation include the use of smart contracts or order book relaying, although many other variations are possible and with differing degrees of decentralization.

Because traders on a decentralized exchange often do not need to transfer their assets to the exchange before executing a trade, decentralized exchanges reduce the risk of theft from hacking of exchanges, but liquidity providers do need to transfer tokens to the decentralized exchange. Decentralized exchanges are also more anonymous than exchanges that implement know your customer (KYC) requirements.

There are some signs that decentralized exchanges have been suffering from low trading volumes and market liquidity. The 0x project, a protocol for building decentralized exchanges with interchangeable liquidity attempts to solve this issue.

Drawbacks 
Due to a lack of KYC processes, and no way to revert a transaction, users are at a loss if they are ever hacked for their passwords or private keys.Additionally, users staking in DeFi protocols can suffer what is called an impermanent loss.

Although liquidity pool DEX are the most widely used, they may have some drawbacks. The most common problems of liquidity pool DEXes are price slippage and front running.

Price slippage occurs because of the AMM (Automated Market Makers) nature itself — the larger the deal, the stronger impact it has on the price. For example, if the constant product AMM is in use, every deal must keep the product xy = k constant, where x and y are quantities of two cryptocurrencies (or tokens) in the pool. So the larger is the input amount Δx, the lower is the final ratio y / x that gives an exchange price. The problem is mostly significant for large deals or small liquidity pools.

Front running is a special type of attack in public blockchains when some participant (usually a miner) seeing an upcoming trading transaction puts his own transaction ahead (playing with a transaction fee for example), making the initial transaction less profitable or even reverted.

Degrees of decentralization 
A decentralized exchange can still have centralized components, whereby some control of the exchange is still in the hands of a central authority.

In July 2018, decentralized exchange Bancor was reportedly hacked and suffered a loss of $13.5M in assets before freezing funds. In a Tweet, Charlie Lee, the creator of Litecoin spoke out and claimed an exchange cannot be decentralized if it can lose or freeze customer funds.

Operators of decentralized exchanges can face legal consequences from government regulators. One example is the founder of EtherDelta, who in November 2018 settled charges with the U.S. Securities and Exchange Commission over operating an unregistered securities exchange.

Errors and hacking

Coding errors and hacks are common in DeFi. Blockchain transactions are irreversible, which means that an incorrect or fraudulent DeFi transaction cannot be corrected easily.

The person or entity behind a DeFi protocol may be unknown, and may disappear with investors' money. Investor Michael Novogratz has described some DeFi protocols as "Ponzi-like". 

DeFi has been compared to the initial coin offering craze of 2017, part of a cryptocurrency bubble. Inexperienced investors are at particular risk of losing money because of the sophistication required to interact with DeFi platforms and the lack of any intermediary with customer support. On the other hand, as the code for DeFi smart contracts is generally open-source software that can be copied to set up competing platforms, experienced users and user-created bots might create instabilities as funds shift between platforms which share the same code. In addition, DeFi platforms might inadvertently provide incentives for cryptocurrency miners to destabilize the system. 

In 2021, half of cryptocurrency crime was related to DeFi. This rise has been attributed to a combination of developer incompetence and non-existent or poorly enforced regulations. Theft from DeFi can come from either external hackers stealing from vulnerable projects, or "rug pulls", where the developers and influencers promote a project and then take the money, as a form of pump-and-dump.

Regulation 
In October 2021, the FATF included DeFi in the guidance for crypto service providers, making the authority's aim to regulate this type of asset. They are expecting each individual country to determine if individuals involved in DeFi can be considered a virtual asset provider and be subjected to the FATF's guidelines.

See also 

 Global financial system
 Blockchain
 Cryptocurrency wallet

References 

Cryptocurrencies
Ethereum
Finance